Spirographa is a genus of parasitic fungi. It is the sole genus in the monotypic family Spirographaceae, belong to the order Ostropales. The genus was circumscribed by Alexander Zahlbruckner in 1903, with Spirographa spiralis later assigned as the type species in 1923. The family Spirographaceae was circumscribed by Adam Flakus, Javier Etayo and Jolanta Miadlikowska in 2019 on the basis of molecular phylogenetic analysis. They determined that genus Spirographa is an independent lineage in the Ostropales, sister to the clade containing the families Fissurinaceae, Gomphillaceae, and Graphidaceae.

Species
Spirographa aggregata 
Spirographa arsenii 
Spirographa ascaridiella 
Spirographa ciliata 
Spirographa fusisporella 
Spirographa galligena 
Spirographa giselae 
Spirographa herteliana 
Spirographa hypotrachynae 
Spirographa intermedia 
Spirographa lichenicola 
Spirographa limaciformis 
Spirographa longispora 
Spirographa maroneae 
Spirographa ophiurospora 
Spirographa parmotrematis 
Spirographa pittii 
Spirographa pyramidalis 
Spirographa spiralis 
Spirographa triangularis 
Spirographa tricupulata 
Spirographa usneae 
Spirographa vermiformis 
Spirographa vinosa

References

Ostropales
Ostropales genera
Taxa described in 1903
Taxa named by Alexander Zahlbruckner
Lichenicolous fungi